Bernard Delaire (28 March 1899 – 1 October 2007) was a French naval veteran of the First World War and one of the last six identified French veterans.

External links
 Interview with Bernard Delaire 
 Obituary 

1899 births
2007 deaths
French centenarians
Men centenarians
French military personnel of World War I